Kurdzhipskaya is a rural locality (a stanitsa) in Krasnooktyabrskoye Rural Settlement of Maykopsky District, Russia. The population was 1618 as of 2018. There are 18 streets.

Geography 
Kurdzhipskaya is located 24 km southwest of Tulsky (the district's administrative centre) by road. Dagestanskaya is the nearest rural locality.

References 

Rural localities in Maykopsky District